The Hawaiian tropical high shrublands are a tropical savanna ecoregion in the Hawaiian Islands.

Geography

Flora
The plant communities include open shrublands, grasslands, and deserts. Shrubland species include āheahea (Chenopodium oahuense), ōhelo ai (Vaccinium reticulatum), naenae (Dubautia menziesii), and iliahi (Santalum haleakalae). Alpine grasslands are dominated by tussock grasses, such as Deschampsia nubigena, Eragrostis atropioides, Panicum tenuifolium, and pili uka (Trisetum glomeratum). Deserts occur on the coldest and driest peaks, where only extremely hardy plants such as āhinahina (Argyroxiphium sandwicense) and Dubautia species are able to grow.

Fauna
The nēnē (Branta sandvicensis) is one of the few birds found in alpine shrublands, while uau (Pterodroma sandwichensis) nest in this ecoregion.

See also
List of ecoregions in the United States (WWF)

References

High shrublands
Tropical and subtropical grasslands, savannas, and shrublands of the United States

.
.
Oceanian ecoregions